Thurnauer is a surname. Notable people with the surname include:

Agnès Thurnauer (born 1962), French-Swiss contemporary artist
Gérard Thurnauer (1926 – 2014), French architect
Marion C. Thurnauer (born 1945), American chemist